Acraea burni, the pale-yellow acraea, is a butterfly of the family Nymphalidae. It is found in Eswatini, South Africa, Zimbabwe, eastern Zambia and southern Malawi.

Adults are on wing year round, with a peak from September to April.

The larvae feed on Laportea peduncularis, Pouzolzia mixta and Obetia tenax.

Taxonomy
Acraea burni is sometimes treated as a subspecies of Acraea obeira. See that species for diagnosis.
It is a member of the Acraea pentapolis species group.  But see also Pierre & Bernaud, 2014.

References

External links

Images representing Acraea burni at Bold

burni
Butterflies described in 1896
Butterflies of Africa
Taxa named by Arthur Gardiner Butler